The Cayman Motor Museum is a  automobile museum located in West Bay, Cayman Islands, housing 80 rare, exotic and classic cars and motorbikes owned by Norwegian businessman Andreas Ugland.

It is located near the Cayman Turtle Farm at 864 North West Point Road, West Bay.

Collection
The museum includes the following:

 Replica of the 1886 Benz, the world's first car
 Exact model of the 1905 Cadillac, the first car driven in the Cayman Islands
 Royal 1956 Daimler DK400, Queen Elizabeth II's first limousine
 1930 Rolls-Royce Phantom II 
 1988 Rolls-Royce Limo Silver Spirit
 1954 Corvette
 Ferrari, Rolls-Royces, Corvettes, Jaguars, Maseratis, BMW, etc.

References

External links
Official website

 

Museums established in 2010
Museums in the Cayman Islands
Automotive museums
2010 establishments in the Cayman Islands
Grand Cayman